

This is a list of the National Register of Historic Places listings in Monroe County, Arkansas.

This is intended to be a complete list of the properties and districts on the National Register of Historic Places in Monroe County, Arkansas, United States. The locations of National Register properties and districts for which the latitude and longitude coordinates are included below, may be seen in a map.

There are 41 properties and districts listed on the National Register in the county, including 1 National Historic Landmark.  Another three properties were once listed but have been removed.

Current listings

|}

Former listings

|}

See also

List of National Historic Landmarks in Arkansas
National Register of Historic Places listings in Arkansas

References

 
Monroe County